Cregmore is a small rural area situated in the parish of Lackagh, County Galway, Ireland.

Cregmore is home to a soccer club, a primary school and a golf course. The name of the locality is derived from the Irish An Chreig Mhór roughly translating to 'big rock'; a reference to a steep in the area.

Facilities

Primary school

A hedge school provided for the educational needs of the young people of Cregmore up until the mid-1800s. A Mr. Murphy used to gather the children into a circle in the middle of an old house, charging them a penny for the service. They were taught basic reading and writing skills.
In July 1933, a new school, Cregmore N.S., opened at Cregmore Cross. The school welcomed 108 pupils that first day; from the ages of three and a half to fifteen years.

The school was extended over the years and made way for the present building in 1980. In 2010, a truck collided with several parked vehicles at the school; No injuries occurred.

Soccer club
In 1994, the first Cregmore N.S. soccer team took part in the Galway National Schools SFAI Snickers competition where they managed to reach the semi-finals. At a meeting in Cregmore N.S. on 17 July 1996, Cregmore F.C. was officially formed. It was decided to enter several underage teams in the Galway & District League.
Red and black was chosen as the colours for Cregmore F.C. teams, with red as the predominant colour. The emblem for the new club was designed to include a depiction of the river and arches at Cregmore Bridge as the River Clare.

Golf club
Cregmore Park Golf Club opened for play in June 2007. It is a 7,078 yard, par 72 championship course designed by Arthur Spring. It is located on the eastern outskirts of Galway City. The course contains 2 lakes; which come into play on 3 holes, as well as 82 bunkers and 3,000 trees.

Notable people

Greg Cunningham, association football player for Cardiff City F.C.
Ryan Manning, association football player for Queens Park Rangers.
Hector Ó hEochagáin, television and radio presenter

References

Townlands of County Galway